Man Raze are an English three-piece alternative rock band originally from Finchley, London, England formed in 2004, featuring Phil Collen, Simon Laffy and Paul Cook.

History
Phil Collen made fans aware of the band for the first time during a 28 November 2004 interview with Braveworlds & Bloody Knuckles online magazine. Stating "I was over in England this summer and I met up with Simon Laffy, who used to be the bass player in my old band, Girl, and Paul Cook, who was the drummer in The Sex Pistols. We've got this new band called Man-Raze". In January 2005 Phil appeared on the Jonsey's Jukebox radio show with Def Leppard, hosted by Cook's former Sex Pistols bandmate Steve Jones. The demo version of "Skin Crawl" was broadcast during the show. This was the first time any Man Raze music had been made public.

Debut live show + single (2005)
Man Raze played a sold-out show at the Spitz club near Old Spitalfields Market in London, England, on 27 September 2005. The band played to an intimate crowd of just 200 people including fans, friends and family and the media. Nine new songs were debuted and the band received rave reviews in the press. Man Raze then released their first single called "Skin Crawl" as a maxi-single CD on 31 October 2005 in the UK. The single was released on their own label, Surrealist Records. It featured four tracks including a remix of the single and an instrumental dub version of 'Runnin' Me Up'. The single reached number 9 on the UK Top 40 Rock Singles Chart.

Having played their first live show the band realised they were more of a straight ahead rock band and began to tone down their experimental side. Work continued on the debut album, titled "Surreal". Much of the album was re-worked and re-recorded at Def Leppard singer Joe Elliott's home studio in Dublin during April 2006.

New website and digital download (2007)
In June 2007 the band re-launched their official website and added a new digital store. At this time they also released their second single. "Turn It Up", which was part of a digital bundle that also featured album track 'Connected To You' plus a newly recorded version of 'You're So Wrong'. The promo video for 'Turn It Up' was also included, the band's first video. Shot in black and white in a rehearsal studio. The song "Turn It Up" was featured on ESPN (American Sports Channel) College Football coverage. The album was due for release in September 2007 and then delayed to January 2008, due to external commitments of band members.

In June 2007, Man Raze made their first TV appearance on the UK channel Rockworld TV Performing three acoustic songs and being interviewed by Gary Crowley on his Gary Crowley Presents... show. The show was later re-broadcast and titled "Man Raze In Session".

Second live show and documentary (2008)
In March 2008, the band came together in California to rehearse and to film a documentary. Footage was shot for broadcast on TV and as bonus footage for the album release. On 19 March the band played their second live show at a rehearsal studio in Los Angeles. 15 members of the official online Man Raze Street Team won the chance to be there and meet the band. The band played nine songs, including three for the very first time. VH1 Classic in the US are set to broadcast footage from the show in June 2008.

Debut album release (2008)
The debut album Surreal was released in the USA on the VH1 Classic label on 3 June 2008. The album contains 12 tracks and the band aim to play live shows in between other band commitments. The song 'Turn It Up' was released to radio in the USA during May and a 30-second advert for the album was added to the VH1 Classic channel.

Surreal was released online on 14 May 2008 featuring a bonus Dub version of 'Turn It Up' and its video.

The band launched an official video channel on YouTube in May 2008. It features videos approved only by the band including live footage and interviews. During June 2008, 12 video clips were added to the channel previewing the documentary 'Man Raze The Film' which is due to be shown on TV later in the year.

UK album release/UK Tour (2008)
The debut album Surreal was released in the UK on 1 December 2008. It included a 5-track European bonus disc.

To support the release of the album in their homeland the band embarked on their first ever tour, playing four dates around the UK: 3 December at Manchester, 4 December at Birmingham, and 8–9 December at London.

UK Tour with Alice Cooper (2009)
After Def Leppard cancelled North American tour in late 2009 that Man Raze were going to support, the band were invited to support Alice Cooper on all of his UK dates in late November/early December 2009.

Band members
Phil Collen - lead vocals/guitar (2004–present)
Simon Laffy - bass guitar/backing vocals (2004–present)
Paul Cook - drums (2004–present)

Discography

Albums
 Surreal - (USA June 2008/UK December 2008)
 PunkFunkRootsRock (2011)

Singles
 "Skin Crawl" CD Maxi Single - (October 2005) UK Top 40 Rock Singles #9
 "Turn It Up" Digital Download - (June 2007)

Tours

ManRaze UK Tour with Alice Cooper 2009

ManRaze UK Tour 2008

ManRaze Past Shows

References

External links
Man Raze.com Official Man Raze site
Man Raze Street Team Official Street Team MySpace Page
Man Raze Forum Official Man Raze Message Board
YouTube.com Official Man Raze Video Channel
Man Raze UK Unofficial Fansite
Amazon Order Surreal
 2015 Phil Collen Interview on Guitar.com

 
English rock music groups
Rock music supergroups
Musical groups established in 2004